Euparius paganus is a species of fungus weevils in the family Anthribidae. It is found in North America.

References

 Valentine, Barry D. (1998). "A review of Nearctic and some related Anthribidae (Coleoptera)". Insecta Mundi, vol. 12, no. 3 and 4, 251–296.

Further reading

 Arnett, R.H. Jr., M. C. Thomas, P. E. Skelley and J. H. Frank. (eds.). (2002). American Beetles, Volume II: Polyphaga: Scarabaeoidea through Curculionoidea. CRC Press LLC, Boca Raton, FL.
 Arnett, Ross H. (2000). American Insects: A Handbook of the Insects of America North of Mexico. CRC Press.
 Richard E. White. (1983). Peterson Field Guides: Beetles. Houghton Mifflin Company.

Anthribidae
Beetles described in 1833